Cotton Tree Lodge is a jungle lodge in the Toledo District of Belize. The lodge was built in 2006 and opened January 2007.

The lodge is all-inclusive and offers fresh local cuisine, daily tours, and on-the-grounds activities.  Tours include Lubaantun, Nim Li Punit, the Garifuna village of Barranco, swimming in Blue Creek Cave, waterfalls, cacao (chocolate) making workshops, tortilla-making workshops, and more.  Kayaking, horseback riding, swimming, medicinal plant walks, birding, and mountain biking are available on the grounds.  Accommodations include eleven guest cabanas with private bathrooms.

The focus is on ecotourism and the lodge has implemented sustainability efforts throughout the property.  Cotton Tree Lodge is off-the-grid and uses solar panels for most of its energy needs.  Toilets are composting and waste flows into a self-contained tank which is drained by banana trees.  Sustainable Harvest International, a non-profit focuses on sustainable agriculture, and The Cotton Tree Lodge have partnered to establish and organic demonstration garden at the lodge.

Gallery

References

External links 
 
 Sustainable Harvest International

Hotel buildings completed in 2006
Hotels established in 2007
Resorts in Belize
Toledo District